Austin MacDonald (born July 17, 1995) is a Canadian actor, best known for his role as Roger in 2008 film Kit Kittredge: An American Girl and as Andy in the Roxy Hunter film series.  In 2013, he won the Young Artist Award for Best Supporting Actor in a Feature Film for his role as Brian in Jesus Henry Christ.

Filmography

Accolades

References

External links

1995 births
Living people
Male actors from Ontario
Canadian male child actors
Canadian male film actors
Canadian male television actors
21st-century Canadian male actors
People from Mississauga